The wildlife of Sierra Leone is very diverse due to the variety of different habitats within the country. Sierra Leone is home to approximately 2090 known higher plant species, 147 known species of mammals, 172 known breeding bird species, 67 known reptile species, 35 known amphibian species and 99 known species of fish.

Mammals

There are approximately 147 known species of wild mammals within Sierra Leone. Members of fourteen orders of placental mammals inhabit Sierra Leone.  The endangered pygmy hippopotamus has territories around the islands on the Moa River and is widespread in the Gola Forest area.  There are three species of wild pig that occur across Sierra Leone: the wart hog, the giant forest hog and the red river hog.

Sierra Leone has 15 identified species of primates that include bushbaby, monkeys and a great ape, the common chimpanzee which is Sierra Leone's largest primate.  Chimpanzees are found across the country with the 2010 chimpanzee census estimated a wild population in excess of 5500 more than double the number previously thought to live in the country. This is the second largest population of the endangered subspecies of western chimpanzee, after Guinea,
with the largest density in the Loma area, 2.69 individuals per km2, and the Outamba, with 1.21 individuals per km2.

There are several species of whales and the African manatee in the waters of Sierra Leone.  The manatee is an endangered species and lives in the rivers and estuaries of Sierra Leone especially around Bonthe.

Mammals found in Sierra Leone include:

Hippopotamus
African bush elephant
  Bongo
  Duiker
African forest buffalo
Diana monkey
African leopard
Olive baboon
Guinea baboon
Western chimpanzee
Waterbuck
Western red colobus
Red colobus
Green monkey
Red river hog
Warthog
Lesser spot-nosed monkey
Black and White Colobus
Pygmy Hippopotamus
Serval
African wild dog

Birds

Sierra Leone has over 630 known  species of bird ten of which are considered endangered including rufous fishing-owl and Gola malimbe.  On the coastal area there are several important sites for migratory ducks and wading birds from the Palearctic realm.
African harrier-hawk
Black-collared lovebird
Blue-headed wood-dove
Iris glossy-starling
White-breasted guineafowl
White-necked rockfowl
North African ostrich
Savanna sparrow

Reptiles
There are 67 known species of reptiles, three of which are endangered, in Sierra Leone including several large reptiles.  There are three species of crocodiles, the Nile crocodile, the slender-snouted crocodile which lives in forest streams, dwarf crocodile found in mangrove swamps.  All the species of sea turtles live in the waters of Sierra Leone with the green turtle and leatherback turtle laying eggs on the shores including on Sherbro Island and Turtle Island. Common species of lizard include the large Nile monitor, the agama seen around settlements, the Brook's house gecko often lives inside houses, and chamaeleos.

Amphibians
As of 2009, the critically endangered Tai toad was discovered in the Gola Forest, which was thought to be endemic to Taï National Park in Côte d’Ivoire.

Fish
A snake eel is a marine fish only known from a single specimen found in the gut of another fish off the coast of Sierra Leone.  The country also hosts a number of killifish in the genus Scriptaphyosemion as well as a number of freshwater catfish, including a species of electric catfish.

Invertebrates

Sierra Leone has around 750 species of butterflies.  Including one of the largest butterflies the giant African swallowtail whose wingspan can be up to 25 cm.
In the project zone of a study in 2011, 140 species of dragonflies and damselflies were known to occur.  It's estimated that this represents 80% of the species found in Sierra Leone.

Flora
Wild flora vegetation types include the lowland moist and semi-deciduous forests, part of the Western Guinean lowland forests, inland valley 
swamps, wooded savannah, bolilands and mangrove swamps.  There are about 2,000 known species of plants with 74 species only occurring only in Sierra Leone.  Primary rainforest used to cover around 70% of Sierra Leone in the mid-2000s this had reduced to around 6%.  Common species include:

Red mangrove which grows in swamp areas along the western coast.
Oil palm used for palm oil and palm wine.
Cotton tree one of which is a historical symbol of Freetown.
Red ironwood tree

See also
 Cotton Tree (Sierra Leone)

References

External links

Biota of Sierra Leone
Sierra Leone